Stefanie Weichelt (born 23 August 1983 in Parchim, Bezirk Schwerin) is a German footballer. She currently plays for MSV Duisburg.

Honours

1. FFC Turbine Potsdam
Bundesliga: Runner-up (2) 2000–01, 2001–02

1. FFC Frankfurt
Bundesliga: Winner (2) 2002–03, 2004–05, Runner-up (1) 2003–04
German Cup: Winner (1) 2002–03, Runner-up (2) 2003–04, 2004–05

Germany
UEFA Women's U-19 Championship: Winner (1) 2002

References

External links
 
 

1983 births
Living people
People from Parchim
People from Bezirk Schwerin
German women's footballers
Footballers from Mecklenburg-Western Pomerania
1. FFC Turbine Potsdam players
1. FFC Frankfurt players
SGS Essen players
FCR 2001 Duisburg players
MSV Duisburg (women) players
Frauen-Bundesliga players
Women's association football forwards
20th-century German women